The J/28 is an American sailboat designed by Rod Johnstone and first built in 1986.

Production
The boat was built by J/Boats (Tillotson Pearson) in the United States. The company completed 71 examples between 1986 and 1988, but it is now out of production.

Design

The J/28 is a small recreational keelboat, built predominantly of fiberglass, with wood trim. It has a fractional sloop rig, an internally-mounted spade-type rudder and a fixed fin keel. It displaces  and carries  of ballast.

See also
List of sailing boat types

Similar sailboats
Alerion Express 28
Aloha 28
Beneteau First 285
Bristol Channel Cutter
Cal 28
Catalina 28
Cumulus 28
Grampian 28
Hunter 28
Hunter 28.5
Hunter 280
O'Day 28
Pearson 28
Sabre 28
Sea Sprite 27
Sirius 28
Tanzer 28
TES 28 Magnam
Viking 28

References

External links

Keelboats
1980s sailboat type designs
Sailing yachts
Sailboat type designs by Rod Johnstone
Sailboat types built by J/Boats